Wickham is a town located 1,572 km north of Perth and 13 km north of Roebourne in the Pilbara region of Western Australia. In 2016 Wickham had a population of 2,295 people. Aboriginal people made up 17.2% of the population, five times the state average.

History
Wickham was established in 1970 by Cliffs Robe River Iron Associates (Robe) and named after John Clements Wickham, the captain of HMS Beagle, who surveyed the north-west coast in 1840.

The town's first permanent buildings were completed in 1970 by Robe to support its iron-ore mine at Pannawonica, and pelletising plant and shiploading at Cape Lambert. The majority of the residences and facilities in town are owned by Rio Tinto. Wickham was originally a closed company town but from 1980 has been jointly administered by Robe and the Shire of Roebourne. In August 2000 Rio Tinto acquired a majority interest in the Robe River Iron Associates joint venture and in 2012 established a new Wickham South subdivision that included 212 new dwellings, 25 residential lots, and 198 new FIFO accommodation units.

References 

Mining towns in Western Australia
Towns in Western Australia
City of Karratha